The Ministry of Skill Development and Entrepreneurship is a Ministry of Government of India set up on 9 November 2014 to coordinate all skill development efforts across the country.
The ministry is headed by Union Minister Dharmendra Pradhan.
 Industrial training, apprenticeship and other skill development responsibilities were transferred from the Ministry of Labour and Employment to this newly made ministry on 16 April 2015. It aims to remove the disconnect between demand and supply of skilled manpower, to build the new skills and innovative thinking not only for existing jobs but also for jobs that are to be created.

Ministers

List of Ministers of State

Organizations
The Ministry is in charge of providing and facilitating skill development initiatives and training infrastructure with the following institutions.

Director General of Training (formerly the Directorate General of Training & Employment, Ministry of Labour and Employment)
National Skill Development Corporation
National Skill Development Agency
 National Skill Development Fund
 National Institute of Entrepreneurship and Small Business Development (NIESBUD)

Schemes 
 Pradhan Mantri Kaushal Vikas Yojana
 UDAAN, a Special Industry Initiative for J&K
 Start-up Village Entrepreneurship Programme (SVEP), to support entrepreneurs in rural areas to set-up enterprises at the village-level in non-agricultural sectors.

See also 
 Industrial training institute

References

External links
 Official Website

 
Skill development and Entrepreneurship